Saleh Nasr (born 7 December 1999) is an Egyptian professional footballer who plays as a midfielder for Al Ahly.

Career statistics

Club

Notes

References

1999 births
Living people
Egyptian footballers
Association football midfielders
Egyptian Premier League players
Al Ahly SC players
Wadi Degla SC players